Elisabetta Gregoraci (born 8 February 1980) is an Italian fashion model and TV personality.

She was born in Soverato, province of Catanzaro, Calabria, in southern Italy.  Gregoraci started her career on the Italian television show Libero as a dancer, before replacing model Eva Herzigová for the Wonderbra campaign.

Gregoraci gained notoriety when it came to light that she had offered sexual favours in return for a job as a showgirl for the Italian national public television company RAI. She was estranged from RAI and hired by the former Italian Prime Minister and owner of Mediaset Silvio Berlusconi, acting as a hostess in the show Buona Domenica.

Personal life
On 14 June 2008, Gregoraci married Flavio Briatore, then Formula One manager, in the Santo Spirito in Sassia, Rome. The driver of the bridal car was Fernando Alonso, who after the ceremony drove the newlyweds to the reception at the castle of Torcrescenza.

Gregoraci gave birth to a son in 2010. Briatore already had a daughter, Leni Klum with German model Heidi Klum, although he is not involved in her life.

References

External links

1980 births
Living people
People from the Province of Catanzaro
Italian female models
Italian showgirls